Voronezh State Pedagogical University is a public university located in Voronezh, Russia.

History 
Formed in 1931 as Voronezh Agrarian Pedagogical Institute. A year later, the institute was named after the famous Soviet historian - Marxist Pokrovsky M.N., distance learning was opened.

In 1941, because of the war, the staff of the institute was evacuated to the city of Urzhum, Kirov Region, and in 1944 they were returned.

In 1981, the institute was awarded the Order of the Badge of Honor for success in the education of personnel. In 1993 the institute was given the title of university.

Structure

External links

 Voronezh State Pedagogical University

Voronezh
Teachers colleges in Russia
Universities in Russia
1931 establishments in Russia
Educational institutions established in 1931
Universities and institutes established in the Soviet Union
Buildings and structures in Voronezh Oblast